The Caldwell Parsonage is located along Caldwell Avenue in Union, New Jersey, United States. It was the home of the Rev. James Caldwell, a Presbyterian minister and active supporter of the Patriot cause during the Revolutionary War.

The war is intertwined with the early history of the building. An original parsonage dating to 1730 was burned in 1780 by a Loyalist mob, and later that year Caldwell's wife Hannah was killed by British soldiers in the house during the Battle of Connecticut Farms. Caldwell himself was shot by an American sentry a year later.

In 1782, with the war over, what is now Connecticut Farms Presbyterian Church built the present building. It continued to serve as a home for its pastors until the 20th century, when the church built one closer to the building. In 1982 it was added to the National Register of Historic Places, as a well-preserved 18th-century farmhouse with a historical connection.

It currently serves as a historical museum, owned and operated by the Union Township Historical Society. It is open to the public on weekday mornings and afternoons. Several state grants have been made for renovations and upkeep of the aging structure.

See also
National Register of Historic Places listings in Union County, New Jersey

References

External links
 Union Township Historical Society

Houses on the National Register of Historic Places in New Jersey
Historic house museums in New Jersey
Houses completed in 1782
American Revolutionary War sites
Clergy houses in the United States
Museums in Union County, New Jersey
Houses in Union County, New Jersey
National Register of Historic Places in Union County, New Jersey
Union Township, Union County, New Jersey
1782 establishments in New Jersey